Drôles de zèbres is a 1977 French comedy film.

Two unemployed men, heavily in debt due to losses at the racetrack, are hired by a criminal mastermind to harass the guests of a hotel he hopes to purchase at a below-market price in order to access a tunnel below the building that leads directly to a nearby bank.

Written and directed by Guy Lux, the film stars Patrick Topaloff, Coluche, Annie Cordy, Claude François, Sim, Petula Clark, and Katia Tchenko.

References 

1977 films
1977 comedy films
French comedy films
1970s French films